This is an incomplete list of Australians who have been appointed a knight or a dame, being entitled to be known as "Sir" or "Dame" respectively. It includes Living Australian knights and dames as well as dead appointees. The list excludes Australian baronets; they have the title Sir, but are not knights per se.

Criteria

For the purposes of this list, an Australian is either:
 an Australian citizen (Australian citizenship did not exist prior to 26 January 1949), or
 a British subject who was born in or whose primary domicile was in Australia (1 January 1901 – 25 January 1949), or in the Australian colonies (26 January 1788 – 31 December 1900).

Hence, the list does not include most knighted British governors-general or colonial or state governors.  Their primary domicile was, generally, in the United Kingdom, and they were only temporarily based in Australia.  Those who chose to remain in Australia in retirement are listed below.

These appointments were made under:
 the British Imperial honours system. These were recommended by the Australian Government until 1982 and state governments until 1989 (in some cases, recommendations were made by other governments of the Commonwealth of Nations, principally the United Kingdom); and
 the Australian Honours System established in 1975. The categories of Knight and Dame of the Order of Australia were created by the Queen on advice from the Fraser Liberal-National coalition government in 1976, and discontinued by her on advice from the Hawke Labor government in 1986. During that period, twelve Knights and two Dames of the Order of Australia were appointed. On 25 March 2014 Tony Abbott announced the reintroduction of Knights and Dames to the Australian Honours System. Two more Knights and two more Dames were created. On 2 November 2015, they were once again removed from the honours list on the advice of Prime Minister Malcolm Turnbull.

Appointments as knight or dame under the orders of foreign countries are not included, with the exception of British Imperial honours awarded to Australians by the UK and PNG Governments after 5 October 1992. Unlike other foreign citizens, citizens of Commonwealth realms appointed knight or dame of a British order are entitled to use the titles "Sir" or "Dame", and use the relevant post nominal. The UK government does not recognize Australian knighthoods as giving entitlement to use these titles in the UK, however.

Many of the people shown had other honours, such as AC, OBE, CMG, VC, etc.  These details are not relevant to this list, and are not shown.

Most of the details were sourced from It's an Honour, the Australian Government database of honours and awards.  All names of those who were appointed to orders of chivalry (Order of Australia, Order of the British Empire, etc) that appear in It's an Honour are listed. Not all awards appear in It's an Honour, as awardees may elect not to have their awards included in the database.  The list of Knights Bachelor is also incomplete.

Order of the Garter

Knights of the Order of the Garter:

Knights (KG)

Order of the Thistle

Knights of the Order of the Thistle:

Knights (KT)

 Note: Sir Robert Menzies is the only Australian ever appointed a Knight of the Order of the Thistle.  The award was made in 1963, during his tenure as Prime Minister of Australia.  He was also appointed a Knight of the Order of Australia (AK) in 1976.

Order of the Bath

Knights of the Order of the Bath:

Knights Grand Cross (GCB)

Knights Commander (KCB)

Order of Australia

Knights and Dames of the Order of Australia:

Dames (AD)

Knights (AK)

Note: This is a complete list of the Australians who were or are Knights of the Order of Australia. Charles, Prince of Wales, heir to the Australian throne but not himself an Australian, was also appointed AK, by amendment to the Constitution of the Order of Australia in 1981.  His father, Prince Philip, Duke of Edinburgh, was also made a Knight of the Order of Australia in 2015.

Order of St Michael and St George

Knights of the Order of St Michael and St George:

Knights Grand Cross (GCMG)

Knights Commander (KCMG)

Royal Victorian Order

Knights of the Royal Victorian Order:

Knights Grand Cross (GCVO)

Knights Commander (KCVO)

Order of the British Empire

Knights and Dames of the Order of the British Empire:

Dames Grand Cross (GBE)

Knights Grand Cross (GBE)

Dames Commander (DBE)

Knights Commander (KBE)

Knights Bachelor

This list of Australian Knights Bachelor is incomplete.  You can assist by adding to it.

Note: There are no postnominal letters associated with the award of Knight Bachelor.

New Zealand Order of Merit
Some Australians have dual citizenship with New Zealand. New Zealand awards knighthoods and damehoods through the New Zealand Order of Merit. All citizens of Commonwealth realms are eligible to be appointed to the order in any grade.

Dame Companion

Non-Australian knights and dames with significant Australian associations

See also
 Living Australian knights and dames
 List of knights and dames of the Order of Australia
 Australian peers and baronets

References

Citations

Sources 

 "It's an Honour", the Australian Government database of honours and awards.
 "Australian Dictionary of Biography"